"Off & On" is a pop song released by British recording artist Sophie Ellis-Bextor as the fifth overall single from her fourth studio album, Make a Scene. It was released on 11 April 2011, exclusively in the Russian Federation as a digital download, a week before the release of the album there. Ellis-Bextor appeared on various talk shows in the United Kingdom to promote the song, including The Rob Brydon Show, despite it not being released as a single there.

Background
"Off & On" was produced by Calvin Harris. The song was penned with songwriter Cathy Dennis, and was first recorded by Irish singer Róisín Murphy for her album Overpowered; however, it was cut from the final track list. It was then offered to Ellis-Bextor, who subsequently recorded her own version. Of the song, Ellis-Bextor stated: "Ordinarily I'm a bit squeamish about taking on songs that I didn't write. But I think you've always got to think that you can bring something to it." A demo version was added to Ellis-Bextor's MySpace in July 2008, alongside "Heartbreak (Make Me a Dancer)". The single was exclusively released in the Russian Federation, a week prior to the release of the album there.

Charts

Versions
 Off And On (Róisín Murphy's Version) – 3:30
 Off & On (Sophie Ellis-Bextor's Demo) – 3:15
 Off & On (Sophie Ellis-Bextor's Final Version) – 3:33
 Off & On (Calvin Harris Remix) – 3:51
 Off And On (Róisín Murphy and Sophie Ellis-Bextor Mashup) – 3:31

References

2011 singles
Songs written by Cathy Dennis
Sophie Ellis-Bextor songs
Songs written by Róisín Murphy
2010 songs
Songs written by Calvin Harris
Universal Records singles
British synth-pop songs